Daniel James Dailey Jr. (December 14, 1915 – October 16, 1978) was an American actor and dancer. He is best remembered for a series of popular musicals he made at 20th Century Fox such as Mother Wore Tights (1947).

Biography

Early life
Dailey was born on December 14, 1915, in New York City, to Daniel James Dailey Sr. and Helen Theresa (née Ryan) Dailey. His younger sister was actress Irene Dailey.

Theatre
He appeared in a minstrel show in 1921 and later appeared in vaudeville. He worked as a golf caddy and shoe seller before his first big break, working for a South American cruise line in 1934.

He made his Broadway debut in 1937 in Babes in Arms. He followed it with Stars in Your Eyes and I Married an Angel.

MGM
In 1940, he was signed by Metro-Goldwyn-Mayer to make films and, although his past career had been in musicals, he was initially cast in the drama Susan and God (1940). He also played a Nazi in The Mortal Storm (1940).

Dailey was the juvenile lead in The Captain Is a Lady (1940) and Dulcy (1940). He appeared in a musical comedy in Hullabaloo (1940), then had a small role in the drama Keeping Company (1941) and was the juvenile in The Wild Man of Borneo (1941). He could be seen in Washington Melodrama (1941) and Ziegfeld Girl (1941), and played a gangster in The Get-Away (1941).

Dailey was third billed in a "B", Down in San Diego (1941) and had a small part in an "A" musical, Lady Be Good (1941).

Dailey was loaned out to 20th Century Fox for Moon Over Her Shoulder (1941), then appeared opposite Donna Reed in Mokey (1942). He was third-billed in Sunday Punch (1942).

Universal borrowed him to support Leo Carrillo in Timber (1942). He stayed at that studio for Give Out, Sisters (1942), a musical with The Andrews Sisters and Donald O'Connor.

Dailey's last film for MGM was Panama Hattie (1942). It was a hit and Dailey's career looked like it was going to the next level when cast in For Me and My Gal. However Dailey was drafted and Gene Kelly ended up taking the role.

World War II
He served in the United States Army during World War II, commissioned as an Army officer after graduation from Signal Corps Officer Candidate School at Fort Monmouth, New Jersey. During his army service, he appeared in This Is the Army (1943).

20th Century Fox
When Dailey returned to Hollywood MGM did not renew his contract, which led him to sign a contract with 20th Century Fox. Their association began brilliantly with Mother Wore Tights (1947) in which Dailey supported the studio's biggest star, Betty Grable. His part was built up during filming and the movie was Fox's most popular movie of 1947, making $5 million.

Fox promptly cast Dailey opposite their other big female star, Jeanne Crain, in You Were Meant for Me (1948). It was directed by Lloyd Bacon who also directed him in Give My Regards to Broadway (1948).

Dailey was reunited with Grable in When My Baby Smiles at Me (1948). It was Fox's biggest hit of the year and garnered Dailey an Academy Award nomination for Best Actor at the 21st Academy Awards.

Fox tried Dailey in a comedy, Chicken Every Sunday (1949) with Celeste Holm, then he teamed with Anne Baxter in the popular musical You're My Everything (1949).

In 1949, he showcased his singing abilities by recording four songs for Decca Records with the popular Andrews Sisters. Two of the songs were Irish novelties ("Clancy Lowered the Boom!" and "I Had a Hat (When I Came In)"). The other songs, "Take Me Out to the Ball Game" and "In the Good Old Summer Time", capitalized on the success of two MGM blockbuster films of the same names, starring Gene Kelly, Esther Williams, and Frank Sinatra (Take Me Out to the Ball Game); and Judy Garland and Van Johnson (In the Good Old Summertime). Dailey and The Andrews Sisters were an excellent match, and their vocal stylings were full of gaiety and fun.

Dailey starred in a film for John Ford, When Willie Comes Marching Home (1950) which was a mild success at the box office. He received a Golden Globe nomination for Best Actor in a Musical or Comedy in 1951. More popular was a third teaming with Grable, My Blue Heaven (1950). He made a cameo in I'll Get By (1950).

Dailey was reunited with Anne Baxter in A Ticket to Tomahawk (1950), often noted as one of the first screen appearances of Marilyn Monroe, who played a very small part as a dance hall girl. He made a fourth (and final) film with Grable, Call Me Mister (1951).

Fox tried Dailey in a romantic drama, I Can Get It for You Wholesale (1951), playing opposite Susan Hayward. Then he was in a biopic, The Pride of St. Louis (1951), as the baseball player Dizzy Dean.

Dailey made a second film with Ford, a remake of What Price Glory (1952), where he teamed with James Cagney.

Universal borrowed him for a musical, Meet Me at the Fair (1953). Fox put him in a drama, Taxi (1953), then a musical with June Haver, The Girl Next Door (1953). He did another baseball-themed film, The Kid from Left Field (1953).

In 1954 Dailey signed a new seven-year contract with Fox.

Dailey was scheduled to appear in the 20th Century Fox musical extravaganza There's No Business Like Show Business (1954), which featured Irving Berlin's music and also starred Monroe, Ethel Merman, Mitzi Gaynor, Johnnie Ray, and Donald O'Connor, whose wife Gwen divorced him and married Dailey around that time. Filming was delayed due to director Walter Lang's poor health. Dailey agreed to appear in Susan Slept Here and Heller in Pink Tights. But Susan ended up being made with Dick Powell and Pink Tights was postponed. Eventually There's No Business Like Show Business was made and proved to be Dailey's biggest hit in a long time.

Metro-Goldwyn-Mayer

Dailey went to Metro-Goldwyn-Mayer to play GI-turned-advertising man Doug Hallerton in It's Always Fair Weather (1955) alongside Gene Kelly. The film was screened at drive-in theaters and was not a box-office success, although it did receive good reviews.

He starred opposite Cyd Charisse and Agnes Moorehead in Meet Me in Las Vegas (1956).

Dailey returned to Fox for one more musical, The Best Things in Life Are Free (1956) to play songwriter Ray Henderson opposite Gordon MacRae.

The following year, he portrayed "Jughead" Carson in the drama The Wings of Eagles (1957) for John Ford, a biographical film on the life of Frank Wead, starring John Wayne.

He was one of several stars in Fox's comedy Oh, Men! Oh, Women! (1957). For the same studio, he was part of the ensemble in The Wayward Bus (1957). Dailey made a profitable low-budget war film for MGM, Underwater Warrior (1958).

Later career

As the musical genre began to wane in the late-1950s, he moved on to various comedic and dramatic roles on television, including starring in The Four Just Men (1959–60).

He starred with Cantinflas in Pepe (1960) and had a cameo in Hemingway's Adventures of a Young Man (1961) and made Four Nights of the Full Moon (1963) in Spain. He returned to Broadway in Catch Me If You Can (1965).

In the late 1960s, Dailey toured as Oscar Madison in a road production of The Odd Couple, co-starring Elliott Reid as Felix Unger and also featuring Peter Boyle as Murray the cop. He did a stint on Broadway in Plaza Suite.

From 1969 to 1971, Dailey was the Governor opposite Julie Sommars's J.J. in the sitcom The Governor & J.J. which revolved around the relationship between his character, the conservative governor of an unnamed state and his liberal daughter Jennifer Jo. His performance won him the Golden Globe for Best Actor in a Television Musical or Comedy for performances in 1969, the year that this category was introduced.

He starred in a short lived series Faraday & Company in 1973.

Later film performances included The Private Files of J. Edgar Hoover (1977), as Clyde Tolson.

Personal life
Dailey married first wife Elizabeth in 1942. They had one son – Dan, Jr. – in 1947, and separated in 1949. They divorced in 1951.

Dailey's son died by suicide in 1975.

Dailey broke his hip in 1977 and developed anemia. He died on October 16, 1978, from complications following hip replacement surgery. He is buried at Forest Lawn Memorial Park in Glendale, California.

According to his sister, Irene, the Daileys were all practicing Catholics and the whole family always voted Democrat. She and her brother were supportive in the elections of Adlai Stevenson and John F. Kennedy.

Filmography
Films:

Susan and God (1940) – Homer (uncredited)
The Mortal Storm (1940) – Holl
The Captain Is a Lady (1940) – Perth Nickerson
Dulcy (1940) – Bill Ward
Hullabaloo (1940) – Bob Strong
Keeping Company (1940) – Jim Reynolds
The Wild Man of Borneo (1941) – Ed LeMotte
Washington Melodrama (1941) – Whitney King
Ziegfeld Girl (1941) – Jimmy Walters
The Getaway (1941) – Sonny Black
Down in San Diego (1941) – Al Haines
Lady Be Good (1941) – Bill Pattison
Moon Over Her Shoulder (1941) – Rex
Mokey (1942) – Herbert Delano
Sunday Punch (1942) – Olaf 'Ole' Jensen
Timber (1942) – Kansas
Give Out, Sisters (1942) – Bob Edwards
Panama Hattie (1942) – Dick Bulliard
This Is the Army (1943) – Soldier – 'This Is the Army' Number (uncredited)
Mother Wore Tights (1947) – Daddy
You Were Meant for Me (1948) – Chuck Arnold
Give My Regards to Broadway (1948) – Bert Norwick
When My Baby Smiles at Me (1948) – 'Skid' Johnson
Chicken Every Sunday (1948) – Jim Hefferan
You're My Everything (1949) – Timothy O'Connor
When Willie Comes Marching Home (1950) – William 'Bill' Kluggs
A Ticket to Tomahawk (1950) – Johnny Behind-the-Deuces
My Blue Heaven (1950) – Jack Moran
I'll Get By (1950) – G.I. Dancing with June Haver & Gloria DeHaven (uncredited)
Call Me Mister (1951) – Shep Dooley
I Can Get It for You Wholesale (1951) – Teddy Sherman
The Pride of St. Louis (1952) – Jerome Hanna 'Dizzy' Dean
What Price Glory? (1952) – 1st Sgt. Quirt
Taxi (1953) – Ed Nielson
Meet Me at the Fair (1953) – Doc Tilbee
The Girl Next Door (1953) – Bill Carter
The Kid from Left Field (1953) – Larry 'Pop' Cooper
There's No Business Like Show Business (1954) – Terrance Donahue
It's Always Fair Weather (1955) – Doug Hallerton
Meet Me in Las Vegas (1956) – Chuck Rodwell
The Best Things in Life Are Free (1956) – Ray Henderson
The Wings of Eagles (1957) – 'Jughead' Carson
Oh, Men! Oh, Women! (1957) – Arthur Turner
The Wayward Bus (1957) – Ernest Horton
Underwater Warrior (1958) – Cmdr. David Forest
Pepe (1960) – Ted Holt
Hemingway's Adventures of a Young Man (1962) – Billy Campbell
Four Nights of the Full Moon (1963)
The Private Files of J. Edgar Hoover (1977) – Clyde Tolson (final film role)

Radio:
Philco Radio Time (1948)
Lux Radio Theatre (1949–1954) (multiple adaptations)

Television:
The Four Just Men (1959–1960)
The Untouchables Dexter Bayless (1962)The Governor & J.J. (1969–1970) – Gov. William DrinkwaterHere's Lucy 1971Faraday & Company (1973–1974) – Frank Faraday

Stage:Babes in Arms (1937)I Married an Angel (1939)Stars in Your Eyes (1939)Burlesque (1958)Take Me Along (1961)Guys and Dolls (1961–1965)High Button Shoes (1964)Catch Me If You Can (1965; 1972)The Odd Couple (1966–1968)Plaza Suite (1969–1970)

Other:Tournament of Roses (narrator) (1954)Testimony of Two Men'' (TV mini-series) (1977)

Box office ranking
For a number of years, movie exhibitors voted Dailey among the most popular stars in the country:
1949 – 19th (United States)
1950 – 21st (United States)

References

External links

 
 
 
 
 
 

1915 births
1978 deaths
American male film actors
American male dancers
American male television actors
American male musical theatre actors
American male radio actors
Blackface minstrel performers
Vaudeville performers
Burials at Forest Lawn Memorial Park (Glendale)
Male actors from New York City
Singers from New York City
Best Musical or Comedy Actor Golden Globe (television) winners
Metro-Goldwyn-Mayer contract players
United States Army personnel of World War II
20th-century American male actors
20th-century American singers
United States Army officers
20th-century American dancers
20th-century American male singers
New York (state) Democrats
California Democrats
American Roman Catholics